Calotis is a genus of herbs or small shrubs in the daisy family Asteraceae. Most of the species are native to Australia, while two occur in Asia.

 Species

References

Astereae
Asteraceae genera
Taxa named by Robert Brown (botanist, born 1773)